Heinrich Ernst Peymann (22 May 1737 – 28 January 1823)  was a Danish army officer. He was the supreme commander of the Danish defense against the bombardment of Copenhagen in 1807. He signed the Danish capitulation at Hellerupgård on 9 September 1807.

1737 births
1823 deaths
Danish generals
Danish military commanders of the Napoleonic Wars